Petar Lesov (born 12 September 1960) is a former Bulgarian boxer, who won the Flyweight Gold medal at the 1980 Summer Olympics. He is a two-time European champion in the flyweight division (1981 and 1983). Lesov is currently a boxing coach.

Amateur career
Below is the Olympic record of Petar Lesov, a Bulgarian flyweight boxer who competed in the 1980 Moscow Olympics:

Round of 32: Defeated Onofre Ramírez (Nicaragua) by decision, 5-0
Round of 16: Defeated Hassen Sherif (Ethiopia) by decision, 5-0
Quarterfinal: Defeated Gilberto Roman (Mexico) by decision, 4-1
Semifinal: Defeated Hugh Russell (Ireland) by decision, 5-0
Final: Defeated Viktor Miroshnichenko (USSR) by a second-round TKO (won gold medal)

Professional career
Lesov turned pro in 1991 with little success.  After five defeats by KO or TKO, including a loss to journeyman Wilson Rodriguez, he retired in 1992 with a record of 0-5-0.

External links
 
 

1960 births
Living people
Flyweight boxers
Boxers at the 1980 Summer Olympics
Olympic boxers of Bulgaria
Olympic gold medalists for Bulgaria
Olympic medalists in boxing
Bulgarian male boxers
Medalists at the 1980 Summer Olympics
People from Rakovski
20th-century Bulgarian people